Roberto Ballini (born 14 March 1944) is an Italian former racing cyclist. He won stage 16 of the 1969 Giro d'Italia. he also won the Coppa Placci the same year.

Major results

1964
 2nd Gran Premio della Liberazione
1966
 3rd Gran Premio Industria e Commercio di Prato
1967
 2nd Gran Piemonte
 3rd Gran Premio Città di Camaiore
 6th Milano–Vignola
 9th Overall Tour de Romandie
 9th Trofeo Laigueglia
1968
 2nd Giro dell'Appennino
 2nd Gran Premio Città di Camaiore
 3rd Coppa Bernocchi
 6th Overall Tirreno–Adriatico
 7th Milan–San Remo
 8th Giro di Toscana
1969
 1st Coppa Placci
 1st Stage 16 Giro d'Italia
 3rd GP Montelupo
 5th Overall Tirreno–Adriatico
 9th Coppa Sabatini
1971
 4th Milan–San Remo

References

External links
 

1944 births
Living people
Italian male cyclists
Italian Giro d'Italia stage winners
Sportspeople from Lucca
Cyclists from Tuscany